Amirli also spelt Amerli, is a predominantly Shia Turkmen town in Saladin Governorate, Iraq, approximately 100 km from the Iranian border. It is the centre of a farming region.

History

2007 bombing

On June 7, 2007, a bombing in the marketplace of Amirli killed 165 people and injured 350.

2014 siege by ISIS

The town, and its nearly 20,000 Shia Turkmen, was besieged by the ISIL starting in June 2014. It was running out of food, water, and supplies. A U.N. representative stated, "The situation of the people in Amerli is desperate and demands immediate action to prevent the possible massacre of its citizens." On August 31, the Iraqi army, with help from the United States and Asa'ib Ahl al-Haq, managed to break the siege and entered the city, much to the rejoicing of its citizens. Iran had reportedly played a "military planning" role in breaking siege of Amirli.

References

Populated places in Saladin Governorate
Turkmen communities in Iraq